Tubize is a city and municipality of  Wallonia located in the Belgian province of Walloon Brabant. On January 1, 2006 Tubize had a total population of 22,335. The total area is 32.66 km2 which gives a population density of 684 inhabitants per km2.

The municipality includes the districts of Clabecq, Oisquercq, Saintes, and Tubize. Bordering Flanders, the town is home to a minority of Dutch-speakers.

Ateliers de Tubize
Les Ateliers de Tubize locomotive works was located in Tubize. At least six Tubize locomotives are preserved. One  (Tubize 2069) in Belgium, two narrow gauge locomotives (2365 & 2369) in Jokioinen Museum Railways, Finland, and one narrow-gauge (2179) in Poland. One locomotive is still in operation on the Pelion railway in Greece. Three are preserved in Iran

See also
 A.F.C. Tubize

References

External links
 

 
Cities in Wallonia
Municipalities of Walloon Brabant